Boris Becker was the defending champion but lost in the quarterfinals to Richard Krajicek.

Andre Agassi won in the final 3–6, 7–6(7–2), 6–3 against Krajicek.

Seeds
A champion seed is indicated in bold text while text in italics indicates the round in which that seed was eliminated. The top eight seeds received a bye to the second round.

Draw

Finals

Top half

Section 1

Section 2

Bottom half

Section 3

Section 4

References

External links
 ATP main draw

Singles